The canton of Aubrac et Carladez is an administrative division of the Aveyron department, southern France. It was created at the French canton reorganisation which came into effect in March 2015. Its seat is in Laguiole.

It consists of the following communes:
 
Argences-en-Aubrac
Brommat
Campouriez
Cantoin
Cassuéjouls
Condom-d'Aubrac
Curières
Florentin-la-Capelle
Huparlac
Lacroix-Barrez
Laguiole
Montézic
Montpeyroux
Mur-de-Barrez
Murols
Saint-Amans-des-Cots
Saint-Chély-d'Aubrac
Saint-Symphorien-de-Thénières
Soulages-Bonneval
Taussac
Thérondels

References

Cantons of Aveyron